Sarah Enany is a literary translator.

She has a PhD in drama and teaches at Cairo University.

She has translated works by Yusuf Idris, Mohamed Salmawy and Ahmed Aboul Gheit, but she is best known for her translation of the Galal trilogy by Kamal Ruhayyim. The first volume of the trilogy, Diary of a Jewish Muslim, was nominated for the Banipal Prize. Her translation of The Girl with Braided Hair by Rasha Adly was also nominated for the Banipal Prize for Arabic Literary Translation in 2021.

She also authored the acclaimed Arabic translation of Les Misérables.

References

Year of birth missing (living people)
Living people
Egyptian translators
Academic staff of Cairo University
Translators of Victor Hugo